The 2015–16 Bangladesh Cricket League was the fourth edition of the Bangladesh Cricket League, a first-class cricket competition. It was held in Bangladesh from 28 January to 8 March 2017. The tournament was played after the conclusion of the other first-class competition in Bangladesh, the 2016–17 National Cricket League. Central Zone were the defending champions. North Zone won the tournament, securing their first title in the competition.

References

Bangladesh Cricket League
Domestic cricket competitions in 2015–16
Bangladeshi cricket seasons from 2000–01
2015 in Bangladeshi cricket
2016 in Bangladeshi cricket